Krasnoselkup is a rural locality (a selo) and the administrative center of Krasnoselkupsky District of Yamalo-Nenets Autonomous Okrug, Russia. Population:

History
Krasnoselkup was founded in 1933 on the site of the Selkup camp Nyaryi Mache. Translated from Selkup, this means "swampy, tundra forest".

In 2006, a school for 500 pupils was built.

References

Rural localities in Yamalo-Nenets Autonomous Okrug
1933 establishments in Russia
Populated places established in 1933
Road-inaccessible communities of Russia